Kinga Gacka (born 25 October 2001) is a Polish athlete sprinter who specializes in the 400 metres.

International competitions

1Aggregate time of two races

References

External links
 

2001 births
Living people
Polish female sprinters
Place of birth missing (living people)
World Athletics Indoor Championships medalists
Athletes (track and field) at the 2018 Summer Youth Olympics
21st-century Polish women
European Athletics Championships medalists